Daying refers to Daying County (大英县), Sichuan, China.

Daying may also refer to:

River
Taping River, known as Daying River (大盈江) in China

Towns
Daying, Lai'an County (大英镇), Anhui

 Written as 大营镇
Daying, Suzhou, Anhui, in Yongqiao District
Daying, Gaoyi County, Hebei
Daying, Xiong County, Hebei
Daying, Zaoqiang County, Hebei
Daying, Baofeng County, Henan
Daying, Sanmenxia, in Shan County, Henan
Daying, Weishi County, Henan
Daying, Jiangsu, in Xinghua
Daying, Liaoning, in Zhuanghe
Daying, Shanxi, in Fanshi County
Daying, Yunnan, in Binchuan County

Townships
Daying Township, Guizhou (大营乡), in Ziyun Miao and Buyei Autonomous County
Daying Township, Shaanxi (大营乡), in Qishan County